Scopula aegrefasciata is a moth of the family Geometridae. It is endemic to India.

References

Moths described in 2001
aegrefasciata
Moths of Asia